Lupo! is a 1970 film directed by Menahem Golan. The script was co-written by Golan and Ken Globus.

Synopsis
His home slated to be torn down, his business in serious financial trouble and his only daughter poised to leave the nest with her wealthy fiancé, small-time Tel Aviv second hand store owner Lupo (Yehuda Barkan) still finds the strength to keep his life, and his pride, together. But as he fights overeager housing authorities and charms his daughter's future in-laws, he finds himself the romantic target of a loud local widow.

Principal cast

External links 

1970 films
Films directed by Menahem Golan
1970s Hebrew-language films
Israeli drama films
Golan-Globus films
Films produced by Menahem Golan
Films set in Tel Aviv
Films with screenplays by Menahem Golan
Films produced by Yoram Globus